USS Cebu (ARG-6) was a Luzon-class internal combustion engine repair ship that saw service in the United States Navy during World War II. Named after Cebu, an island in the Philippines, it was the second ship of the Navy to bear this name.

Construction
Cebu was laid down 21 September 1943, as liberty ship SS Francis P. Duffy, under a Maritime Commission (MARCOM) contract, MCE hull 1805,  by the Bethlehem-Fairfield Shipyard, Inc., in Baltimore, Maryland; launched 18 October 1943; sponsored by Mrs. M. C. Bird; acquired by the Navy 27 October 1943; and commissioned 15 April 1944.

Service history
Cebus special mission was providing shops and trained men for the repair of internal combustion engines, but through the course of the war, her men performed a variety of tasks, ranging from the repairing of ship's clocks to major work on battleships. She arrived at Manus in the Admiralty Islands 10 September 1944. At this fleet base, she prepared small craft and larger ships for their role in the Philippine operations, working many times around the clock in order to insure the readiness of ships vital to the invasion assaults.

Mount Hood explosion

At Manus on 10 November 1944, Cebu was anchored only  from  when the ammunition ship exploded, showering Cebus decks with bomb fragments and heavy projectiles. Five of her men were killed and six wounded, but quick work prevented serious damage to the ship itself. She was able to continue her work without interruption, preparing ships for the Lingayen and Iwo Jima assaults.

Philippines and occupation duty
Cebu was stationed at Ulithi from 22 January to 12 February 1945, when she sailed for San Pedro Bay. Her work continued at a furious rate as victims of suicide attacks required immediate repairs. Her services to small craft at Leyte continued until 21 September, when she sailed for occupation duties at Okinawa and Japan until 11 March 1946.

Operation "Crossroads"

Cebu prepared at Pearl Harbor from 29 March to 11 May 1945, for her role supporting the atomic tests of Operation Crossroads at Bikini and Kwajalein in the summer of 1946.

Decommissioning
She arrived at San Diego, California, 28 September, and was placed out of commission in the Pacific Reserve Fleet at Stockton, California, 30 June 1947.

On 4 August 1961, Cebu was transferred to the National Defense Reserve Fleet at Suisun Bay, California. Her name reverted to Francis P. Duffy and she was struck from the Naval Register on 1 September 1962.

Fate

On 18 October 1973, Francis P. Duffy was sold to Zidell Explorations Inc., for $151,899.99 to be scrapped. She was withdrawn from on 14 November 1973.

Awards
Cebu received one battle star for World War II service.

Notes

Bibliography

Online resources

External links

 

Luzon-class repair ships
Ships built in Baltimore
1943 ships
World War II auxiliary ships of the United States
Pacific Reserve Fleet, Stockton Group
Suisun Bay Reserve Fleet
Maritime incidents in November 1944